Zhang Jike was the defending champion but lost in the semifinals.

Ma Long defeated Fang Bo 11–7, 7–11, 11–4, 11–8, 11–13, 11–4 in the final to win the title.

Seeds
Matches were best of 7 games in qualification and in the 128-player sized main draw.

  Ma Long (champion)
  Xu Xin (fourth round)
  Zhang Jike (semifinals)
  Fan Zhendong (semifinals)
  Jun Mizutani (quarterfinals)
  Dimitrij Ovtcharov (second round)
  Timo Boll (quarterfinals)
  Marcos Freitas (third round)
  Vladimir Samsonov (fourth round)
  Chuang Chih-yuan (first round)
  Koki Niwa (fourth round)
  Tang Peng (quarterfinals)
  Fang Bo (final)
  Gao Ning (fourth round)
  Joo Sae-hyuk (fourth round)
  Wong Chun Ting (fourth round)
  Robert Gardos (second round)
  Tiago Apolónia (second round)
  Panagiotis Gionis (third round)
  Yuto Muramatsu (second round)
  Jung Young-sik (third round)
  Kenta Matsudaira (first round)
  Bastian Steger (second round)
  Chen Chien-an (second round)
  Steffen Mengel (second round)
  Kim Min-seok (third round)
  Simon Gauzy (second round)
  João Monteiro (third round)
  Quadri Aruna (first round)
  Adrien Mattenet (first round)
  Omar Assar (third round)
  Liang Jingkun (third round)
  Sharath Kamal (third round)
  Paul Drinkhall (second round)
  Lee Sang-su (fourth round)
  Kirill Skachkov (first round)
  Adrian Crișan (second round)
  Kristian Karlsson (second round)
  Masaki Yoshida (second round)
  Alexander Shibaev (third round)
  Gustavo Tsuboi (second round)
  Patrick Franziska (quarterfinals)
  Bojan Tokič (first round)
  Daniel Górak (second round)
  Hugo Calderano (second round)
  Jiang Tianyi (third round)
  Mihai Bobocica (second round)
  Liam Pitchford (third round)
  Stefan Fegerl (third round)
  Pär Gerell (first round)
  Alexey Liventsov (second round)
  Daniel Habesohn (second round)
  Chen Weixing (third round)
  Kim Hyok-bong (first round)
  He Zhi Wen (first round)
  Chiang Hung-chieh (second round)
  Wang Zengyi (second round)
  Grigory Vlasov (second round)
  Huang Sheng-sheng (second round)
  Tan Ruiwu (first round)
  Jon Persson (second round)
  Kou Lei (fourth round)
  Emmanuel Lebesson (second round)
  Ho Kwan Kit (second round)

Draw

Finals

Top half

Section 1

Section 2

Section 3

Section 4

Bottom half

Section 5

Section 6

Section 7

Section 8

References

External links
Main draw
Qualifying draw

Men's singles